The Italian Nationalist Association (Associazione Nazionalista Italiana, ANI) was Italy's first nationalist political movement founded in 1910, under the influence of Italian nationalists such as Enrico Corradini and Giovanni Papini. Upon its formation, the ANI supported the repatriation of Austrian held Italian-populated lands to Italy and was willing to endorse war with Austria-Hungary to do so. The party had a paramilitary wing called the Blueshirts. The authoritarian nationalist faction of the ANI would be a major influence for the National Fascist Party of Benito Mussolini formed in 1921. In 1922 the ANI participated in the March on Rome, with an important role, but it was not completely aligned with Benito Mussolini' party. Nevertheless, the ANI merged into the Fascist Party in October 1923.

Ideology

The ANI's ideology remained largely undefined for some time other than it being nationalist. The ANI was divided between supporters of different kinds of nationalism - authoritarian, democratic, moderate, and revolutionary.

Corradini, the ANI's most popular spokesman, linked leftism with nationalism by claiming that Italy was a "proletarian nation" which was being exploited by international capitalism which had led to Italy being disadvantaged economically in international trade and its people divided on class lines, but instead of advocating socialist revolution, he claimed that victory against these oppressing forces would require Italian nationalist sentiment to succeed.

"We are the proletarian people in respect to the rest of the world. Nationalism is our socialism. This established, nationalism must be founded on the truth that Italy is morally and materially a proletarian nation." Manifesto of the Italian Nationalist Association, December 1910. 

<blockquote>
"We must start by recognizing the fact that there are proletarian nations as well as proletarian classes; that is to say, there are nations whose living conditions are subject ... to the way of life of other nations, just as classes are. Once this is realized, nationalism must insist firmly on this truth: Italy is, materially and morally, a proletarian nation." (Report to the First Nationalist Congress, Enrico Corradini, Florence, December 3, 1919)
</blockquote>

Corradini occasionally used the term "national socialism" to define the ideology which he endorsed. Though this is the same term used by the movement of National Socialism in Germany (a.k.a.Nazism) no evidence exists to indicate that Corradini's use of the term had any influence.

In 1914, the ANI began to tilt towards authoritarian nationalism with its endorsement of the creation of an authoritarian corporate state, a radical idea created by Italian law professor Alfredo Rocco. Such a corporate state would be led by a corporate assembly rather than a parliament, which would be composed of unions, business organisations and other economic organisations that would work within a powerful state government to regulate business-labour relations, organise the economy, end class conflict, and make Italy an industrial state which could compete with imperial powers and establish its own empire.

Membership
Many of the ANI supporters were wealthy Italians of right-wing authoritarian nationalist background, in spite of efforts by Corradini and left-leaning nationalists to make the ANI a nationalist mass movement supported by the working-class.

Prominent members(In alphabetical order.)''
Francesco Coppola
Enrico Corradini
Luigi Federzoni
Roberto Forges Davanzati
Ezio Maria Gray
Maurizio Maraviglia
Giovanni Papini
Alfredo Rocco

Electoral results

Italian Parliament

Notes

1910 establishments in Italy
1923 disestablishments in Italy
Political parties established in 1910
Political parties disestablished in 1923
 
Defunct political parties in Italy
Defunct nationalist parties in Italy
Catholic political parties